Chlumčany may refer to places in the Czech Republic:

Chlumčany (Louny District), a municipality and village in the Ústí nad Labem Region
Chlumčany (Plzeň-South District), a municipality and village in the Plzeň Region